Interstate 169 (I-169) is an auxiliary route of I-69E in Texas that currently runs from I-69E in Brownsville southeast concurrently with State Highway 550 (SH 550), a toll road under construction that connects to the Port of Brownsville for . When SH 550 is complete, it will be a limited-access toll route around the northern and eastern edges of Brownsville and signed as I-169, partly replacing and expanding Farm to Market Road 511 (FM 511). Its purpose is to provide a new entry point for truck traffic to the Port of Brownsville and forming a loop that allows traffic to bypass the northern sections of the urbanized extent of the Brownsville city limits. This may serve as a relief route for future traffic congestion and as a future business corridor.

Route description
I-169/SH 550 acts as a connector between I-69E/U.S. Highway 77 (US 77)/U.S. Highway 83 (US 83) and the Port of Brownsville. The routes were constructed on the same routing as Farm to Market Road 511 (FM 511) from its connection with I-69E and US 77/US 83 southeastward to FM 3248. However, only the stretch between the I-69E/US 77/US 83 interchange and Old Alice Road is currently signed as I-169, and SH 550 is currently also incomplete, running along incomplete freeway segments and frontage roads.

Separated travel lanes, intended to be the frontage roads, were the first stage of construction from I-69E and US 77/US 83 to FM 3248. Flyover bridges have been constructed at FM 1847 and at two rail crossings. The second stage of construction built a new divided limited-access highway, which splits from FM 511 at FM 3248 and travels southeast to a new entry point for the Port of Brownsville, and a new crossover bridge at Old Port Isabel Road. The third stage that will complete the mainlanes on the stage-one portion and construct exit ramps directly to and from I-69E and US 77/US 83 at Olmito, began in March and will end in approximately 60 days. The route is a toll route, but the second and third stages of the route are being funded with $36 million of funding from the American Recovery and Reinvestment Act of 2009. According to local authorities in Cameron County, upon full completion, the route will be signed as I-169 as a spur route of I-69E.

History

Previous designation
SH 550 was previously designated on May 22, 1947, from US 80 west of Fort Worth, eastward via Fort Worth and Dallas to US 67 and US 80 east of Dallas. On July 29, 1953, SH 550 extended to SH 183. On September 25, 1953, SH 550 extended north to White Settlement Road. On May 26, 1954, SH 550 extended west to US 80, and the old route to White Settlement Road became a connection. On April 27, 1955, the connection of SH 550 extended north from White Settlement Road to the entrance of the Convair Assembly Plant. On October 30, 1958, the section east of the Dallas–Fort Worth Turnpike was canceled. This highway was transferred to I-20 (now I-30) and State Highway Spur 341 (Spur 341) at the inception of the Interstate Highway System on September 26, 1960.

Current designation
The first segment of SH 550 was opened and designated on July 25, 2008, despite the first stage of construction having been expected to be completed in 2010, with bidding for the final sections. The first phase of the route opened on March 10, 2011, with tolling for the bridge over FM 1847 beginning on May 11, 2011. Phase two, which created a new limited access highway from FM 3248 to a new entrance to the Port of Brownsville, was opened on June 1, 2013.

The I-169 designation along SH 550 between I-69E/US 77/US 83 and Old Alice Road was approved by the American Association of State Highway and Transportation Officials (AASHTO) on May 13, 2015. I-169 was officially designated along the portion of SH 550 between I-69E/US 77/US 83 and Old Alice Road on December 17, 2015. On February 16, 2016, I-169 signs were unveiled by state and local officials along the designated section.

Future
I-169 will extend over the SH 550 freeway to the Port of Brownsville. The entire route was expected to open between early and mid-2016. Although the route has not been completed, construction for SH 550 to the Port of Brownsville is planned to start in 2023.

Exit list

See also

References

External links

 

69-1
69-1
Toll roads in Texas
1 (Texas)
Transportation in Cameron County, Texas
Transportation in Brownsville, Texas